Calceolaria hyssopifolia is a species of plant in the Calceolariaceae family. It is endemic to Ecuador.

The Latin word hyssopifolia (which also occurs in several other plant names, including that of cuphea hyssopifolia) means "hyssop-leafed".

References

Endemic flora of Ecuador
hyssopifolia
Least concern plants
Taxonomy articles created by Polbot